The Diocese of Naples was a Roman Catholic diocese in southern Italy, the see being in Naples. A Christian community was founded there in the 1st century AD and the diocese was raised to the level of a Metropolitan Archdiocese in the 10th century, becoming the Roman Catholic Archdiocese of Naples.

See also 
 Catholic Church in Italy
 List of Bishops and Archbishops of Naples

References 

Former Roman Catholic dioceses in Italy
Christianity in Naples
Dioceses established in the 1st century